Safi al-Din al-Hindi al-Urmawi was a prominent Indian Shafi'i-Ash'ari scholar and rationalist theologian.

Al-Hindi was brought in to debate at Ibn Taymiyya during the second hearing in Damascus in 1306. Taj al-Din al-Subki, in his Tabaqat al-Shafi'iyya al-Kubra, reports him to have said: "Oh Ibn Taymiyya, I see that you are only like a sparrow. Whenever I want to grab it, it escapes from one place to another."

He was praised by Taj al-Din al-Subki, Al-Safadi, Shihab al-Din al-'Umari, Shams al-Din ibn al-Ghazzi, and 'Abd al-Hayy al-Hasani.

Biography 
Safi al-Din al-Hindi was born in Delhi and completed his Islamic education there before settling in Damascus. He visited Egypt and moved to Turkey, where he stayed for eleven years; five in Konya, five in Sivas, and one in Kayseri. He arrived in Damascus in the second half of the 13th century and stayed there until he died.

Safi al-Din al-Hindi studied under Siraj al-Din Urmavi and was said to have indirectly begun his studies with Fakhr al-Din al-Razi, whom he met through his maternal grandfather.
He was the teacher of mutakallim (theologian) Sadr al-Din ibn al-Wakil (d. 1317) and Kamal al-Din ibn al-Zamalkani (d. 1327).

His students, Ibn al-Wakil and Ibn al-Zamalkani and he, had been directly involved in Ibn Taymiyyah's famous 1306 Damascene trials, which were addressed to restrain Ibn Taymiyyah's relentless anti-Ash'ari polemics.

Books 
Among his best-known writings:
 Al-Fa'iq fi Usul al-Fiqh
 Nihayat al-Wusul fi Dirayat al-Usul
 Al-Resalah al-Tis'iniyya fi al-Usul al-Diniyya

Al-Hindi's Tis'iniyya is a straightforward manual of Ash'ari kalam treating the traditional theological topics of God, prophecy, eschatology, and related matters.

At the beginning of the book, al-Hindi explains that the occasion for writing was a disturbance provoked by Hanbalis:  This is not a direct refutation of Ibn Taymiyya, but it was most likely written in response to the challenge that he posed.

See also 
 Taqi al-Din al-Subki
 'Ala' al-Din al-Bukhari
 List of Ash'aris and Maturidis
 List of Muslim theologians

References 

Asharis
Shafi'is
Critics of Ibn Taymiyya
14th-century Muslim theologians
Indian rationalists
Islamic philosophers
Sharia judges
Sunni imams
Sunni Muslim scholars of Islam
Writers from Delhi
1246 births
1315 deaths
13th-century Muslim theologians